Jo is a given name, often a short form (hypocorism) of Joanna, Joanne, Joseph, Josephine, George, etc. Notable people with the name include:

Men
Jô (born 1987), Brazilian footballer, João Alves de Assis Silva 
Jô (footballer, born 1988), Brazilian footballer, Josiel Alves de Oliveira
Jô (footballer, born 1992), Brazilian footballer, Jonatas Figueira Fernandes
Jo Jo Benson (1938–2014), stage name of Joseph M. Hewell, American R&B and soul singer
Jo Inge Berget (born 1990), Norwegian footballer
Jô Bilac (born 1985), Brazilian playwright
Jo Bogaert (born 1956), Flemish musician and producer
Johannes Jo Bonfrère (born 1946), Dutch football player and coach
Joakim Jo Bonnier (1930–1972), Swedish racing driver
Johannes Jo van den Broek (1898–1978), Dutch architect
John Jo Callis (born 1951), British guitarist, notably with The Human League
Jozef Jo Cals (1914–1971), Dutch Prime Minister
Jozef Jo Coenen (born 1949), Dutch architect
Joseph Jo Colruyt (1928 – 1994), Belgian businessman
Jozef Jo Cornu (born 1944), Belgian business executive
Josef Jo Gartner (1954–1986), Austrian racing driver
Johannes Jo van Gastel (1887–1969), Dutch archer
Jo Grimond (1913-1993), British politician
Jo de Haan (1936–2006), Dutch cyclist
, Japanese actor
Joseph Jo Johnson (born 1971), British politician, Minister of State for Transport
Jonathan Jo Jones (1911–1965), American jazz drummer
, Japanese footballer
, Japanese composer and conductor
Jo Leinen (born 1948), German politician and MEP
Jo Maas (born 1954), Dutch racing cyclist
Johannes Jo Meynen (1901–1980), Dutch Ministers of Defence
Jo Nesbø (born 1960), Norwegian writer, musician, former economist and reporter
Johannes Jo van Nunen (1945–2010), Dutch engineer and management consultant
Jo Planckaert (born 1970), Belgian cyclist
Jo Privat (1919–1996), French accordionist and composer.
Jozef Jo Ritzen (born 1945), Dutch economist and social-democratic politician
Johan Jo de Roo (born 1937), Dutch cyclist
Jô Santos (born 1991), Brazilian footballer, Joálisson Santos Oliveira
Joseph Jo Schlesser (1928–1968), French racing driver
Joseph Jo Siffert (1936–1971), Swiss racing driver
José Jô Soares (1938–2022), Brazilian comedian, talk show host, author and musician
Joseph Jo Spier (1900–1978), Dutch artist and illustrator
Johan Jo Vandeurzen (born 1958), Belgian politician, Flemish Minister of Public Health
Joseph Jo Vonlanthen (born 1942), Swiss racing driver
Johan Jo Voskuil (1897–1972), Dutch painter, illustrator, and bookbinder
Johannes Jo Weil (born 1977), German actor

Women
Joanna Jo Aleh (born 1986), New Zealand sailor, national, world and Olympic champion
Johanna Jo van Ammers-Küller (1884–1966), Dutch writer
Joanna Jo Ankier (born 1982), British record holder (1,500-m & 3,000-m steeplechase)
Jo Archbold, model
Josephine Jo Armstead (born 1944), American singer-songwriter
Johanna Jo Bauer-Stumpff (1873–1964), Dutch painter
Johanna Jo Bonger (1862–1925), Dutch art dealer, sister-in-law of Vincent van Gogh
Josephine Jo Brand (born 1957), English comedian, writer and actress
Jo Ann Campbell (born 1938), American singer
Joanne Jo Coburn (born 1968), BBC political correspondent
Helen Joanne Jo Cox (1974–2016), British politician
Johanna Jo Cox-Ladru (1923–?), Dutch Olympic gymnast
Damita Jo DeBlanc (1930–1998), aka Damita Jo, American actress and singer
Joanna Jo Durie (born 1960), English tennis player
Joanne Jo Ellis (born 1983), English field hockey forward
Joanne Jo Frost (born 1970), English nanny, writer and TV hostess
Joanne Jo Kiesanowski (born 1979), New Zealand cyclist
Johanna Jo Konta (born 1991), British tennis player
Jo Lemaire (born 1956), Belgian singer
Jo Muir (born 1994), British modern pentathlete
Jo O'Meara (born 1979), English singer (S Club 7)
Joanne Jo Pavey (born 1973), British Olympian and distance runner
 Jo Price (born 1985), Welsh rugby union player and former footballer
Joanne "Jo" J. K. Rowling (born 1965), author of the Harry Potter book series
Jo Ann Robinson (1912–1990), American civil rights activist
Johanna Jo Schouwenaar-Franssen (1909–1995), Dutch government minister
Billie Jo Spears (1937–2011), American country music singer
Jo Stafford (1917–2008), American singer of traditional pop music
Jo Van Fleet (1915–1996), American theatre and film actress
Jo Walton (born 1964), Welsh-Canadian fantasy and science fiction writer and poet
Joanne Jo Bailey Wells (born 1965), British Anglican bishop, Bishop of Dorking

Fictional characters 
Jo Bennett, former CEO of Sabre in the TV show The Office
Joanne Gardner, lead character from the soap opera Search for Tomorrow
Jo Grant, a 1971–1973 Dr. Who companion
Jo Kido, in the anime series Digimon Adventure
Jo March, in the novel Little Women and its sequels
Jo Martinez, in the supernatural crime drama series Forever
Jo Masters, in the British television series The Bill
Jo Masterson, in ABC Family's Twisted
Josephine "Jo" McCormick, one of the main characters of the TV series Big Bad Beetleborgs
Jo Polniaczek, from the TV show The Facts of Life
Jo Reynolds, in Melrose Place
Jo Saint-Clair, title character of the French TV series Jo
Jo Stockton, one of the main characters of the movie Funny Face
Jo, one of the main characters of anime series Burst Angel
Jo, a crossing sweeper in Charles Dickens's novel Bleak House
Jo, a contestant on Total Drama: Revenge of the Island
Jo Wilson, from ABC's show Grey's Anatomy
Jo, main character from A Taste of Honey

See also
Joanne (given name)
Joanna
Johanna
Joe (given name)
Jordan (name)
Joseph (name)
Johan (given name)
George (given name)
Mary Jo

Dutch feminine given names
Dutch masculine given names
English unisex given names
English-language unisex given names
Japanese masculine given names
Hypocorisms